Diplomatic relations between Albania and the United Kingdom were established on November 9, 1921. The British government recognized the post-war Democratic Government of Albania on November 29, 1944 but the British mission left in April 1946 due to the limitations that the Albanian government of the time had imposed regarding the movement of the members of its mission. The Corfu Channel incident in May 1946 marked the end of these relations. Diplomatic relations between the two countries were restored on May 29, 1991 through a joint communiqué by both parties.

List of diplomatic representatives of Albania to the United Kingdom (1922–present)

References 

 
United Kingdom
Albania